Pravara Institute of Medical Sciences is located in Ahmednagar, Maharashtra, India. The parent trust Pravara Medical Trust was founded by Vithalrao Vikhe Patil in 1972 while the university was founded by Balasaheb Vikhe Patil. The UGC granted Deemed University status in 2003.

The deemed University has following constituent units under its ambit.
1. Rural Medical College 
2. Rural Dental College 
3. Dr. APJ Abdul Kalam College of Physiotherapy 
4. College of Nursing 5. Centre for Biotechnology 
6. Centre for Social Medicine.

References

External links

Universities and colleges in Maharashtra
2003 establishments in Maharashtra
Educational institutions established in 2003